Charles Hérisson (12 October 1831 – 23 November 1893) was a French lawyer and politician of the French Third Republic. He was a member of the National Assembly of 1871, where he joined the Opportunist Republican parliamentary group, Gauche républicaine. He served as minister of commerce in the Government of France. He was a member of the Legion of Honour.

References

Sources

External links
 Fiche biographique sur le site de l'Assemblée nationale

1831 births
1893 deaths
People from Nièvre
Politicians from Bourgogne-Franche-Comté
Opportunist Republicans
French Ministers of Commerce
Members of the National Assembly (1871)
Members of the 2nd Chamber of Deputies of the French Third Republic
Members of the 3rd Chamber of Deputies of the French Third Republic
19th-century French lawyers
Officiers of the Légion d'honneur